Manuel Leaonedas Ayulo (October 20, 1921 – May 17, 1955) was an American racecar driver.  His efforts, along with those of friend and teammate Jack McGrath, helped establish track roadsters as viable race cars.  Ayulo was killed in practice for the 1955 Indianapolis 500 when his car crashed straight into a concrete wall.  He was found to have not been wearing a seat belt and his pockets "were filled with wrenches".

Racing record

Complete AAA Championship Car results

Indianapolis 500 results

* shared drive with Jack McGrath

Complete Formula One World Championship results
(key)

 ''* Indicates shared drive with Jack McGrath.

See also 
List of fatalities at the Indianapolis Motor Speedway

References

External links 
 Profile on Historic Racing 

1921 births
1955 deaths
Sportspeople from Burbank, California
Racing drivers from California
Indianapolis 500 drivers
AAA Championship Car drivers
World Sportscar Championship drivers
Racing drivers who died while racing
Sports deaths in Indiana

Carrera Panamericana drivers